The first season of The New Adventures of Old Christine originally aired on CBS on Monday nights at 9:30/8:30 pm from March 13, 2006 through May 22, 2006. It consisted of 13 episodes.

In this season Christine has only just enrolled her son, Richie at a new posh private school, where she is constantly being humiliated by Marly and Lindsay, some non-working mothers at the school. On top of all this she has just discovered her ex-husband, Richard has started dating a much younger woman who is also named Christine. Christine has a brief fling with Burton but they soon break up due to Christine not being able to commit to the relationship. In the season finale Christine kisses Richard so New Christine breaks up with him. The first season on DVD and Blu-ray Disc box set was released on January 15, 2008.

Cast and characters

Main
 Julia Louis-Dreyfus as "Old" Christine Campbell
 Clark Gregg as Richard Campbell
 Hamish Linklater as Matthew Kimble
 Trevor Gagnon as Ritchie Campbell
 Emily Rutherfurd as "New" Christine Hunter
 Tricia O'Kelley and Alex Kapp Horner as Marly and Lindsay (a.k.a. "The Meanie Moms")

Recurring
 Wanda Sykes as Barbara 'Barb' Baran
 Matt Letscher as Burton Shaffer
 Jordan Baker as Mrs. Belt
 Lily Goff as Ashley Ehrhardt
 Marissa Blanchard as Kelsey

Guest stars
 Amy Farrington as Ali
 Andy Richter as Stan
 Anthony Holiday as Pete
 Scott Lawrence as Nate
 Wendy Raquel Robinson as Anita
 Patrick Kerr as Peter
 Nancy Lenehan as Kit
 Helen Slater as Liz
 Mary Beth McDonough as Mrs. Wilhoite
 Rebecca Creskoff as Hilary
 Ana Ortiz as Belinda

Episodes

Ratings

References

External links
 

2006 American television seasons